Dogtown is an unincorporated community in Walker County, Alabama, United States.

History
United States federal judge Frank Minis Johnson's father, Frank M. Johnson, Sr., formerly taught at a school in Dogtown.

The area is home to several abandoned coal mines.

References

Unincorporated communities in Walker County, Alabama
Unincorporated communities in Alabama